Sheelah's Day, also known as Sheelagh's Day, is an Irish cultural holiday celebrated on 18 March which coincides with St. Patrick's Day. While the holiday is no longer widely celebrated in Ireland, there are still associated festivities celebrated throughout the Irish diaspora in Australia and Canada.

History 
Traditionally, Sheelah's Day was celebrated the day after the Feast of St. Patrick and coincided with the Christian festivities. According to Irish folklore and mythology, Sheelah was either the wife or mother of St. Patrick, and the holiday served to commemorate her life.

Irish antiquarian journals and newspapers from the eighteenth and nineteenth centuries mention a wife of St. Patrick. Freeman's Journal referenced Sheelah's Day in 1785, 1811, and 1841. Australian press from the nineteenth century recorded observances of Sheelah's Day, including the consumption of large amounts of alcohol. Sheelah's Day is no longer officially celebrated in Ireland, but continues to be celebrated in Newfoundland, Canada after Irish immigrants arrived in the late seventeenth century.

In Newfoundland the holiday may also be connected to the legend of the Irish princess Sheila NaGeira.

Some scholars suggest a connection between the holiday and the Sheela na gig, found in medieval architecture throughout Europe.

References 

Cultural festivals in Ireland
Festivals in Newfoundland and Labrador
Irish-Australian culture
Irish-Canadian culture in Newfoundland and Labrador
Irish folklore
March observances
Saint Patrick's Day
Spring (season) events in the Republic of Ireland